"That's That" is a song written by Hugh Prestwood, and recorded by American country pop artist Michael Johnson.  It was released in August 1988 as the third single and title track from the album That's That. The song reached #9 on the Billboard Hot Country Singles & Tracks chart.

Content
The song uses the title phrase to indicate the end of a relationship.

Chart performance

References

1988 singles
1987 songs
Michael Johnson (singer) songs
Songs written by Hugh Prestwood
RCA Records singles
Song recordings produced by Brent Maher